Richard Sproat is a computational linguist currently working for Google as a researcher on text normalization and speech recognition.

Linguistics 

Sproat graduated from Massachusetts Institute of Technology in 1985, under the supervision of Kenneth L. Hale. His PhD thesis is one of the earliest work that derives morphosyntactically complex forms from the module which produces the phonological form that realizes these morpho-syntactic expressions, one of the core ideas in Distributed Morphology.

One of Sproat's main contributions to computational linguistics is in the field of text normalization, where his work with colleagues in 2001, Normalization of non-standard words, was considered a seminal work in formalizing this component of speech synthesis systems.
He has also worked on computational morphology and the computational analysis of writing systems.

External links 

 Personal Homepage

References 

Google people
Living people
MIT School of Humanities, Arts, and Social Sciences alumni
Year of birth missing (living people)